Sarnath (Hindustani pronunciation: [saːɾnaːtʰ], also referred to as Sarangnath, Isipatana, Rishipattana, Migadaya, or Mrigadava) is a place located  northeast of Varanasi, near the confluence of the Ganges and the Varuna rivers in Uttar Pradesh, India.

Sarnath is where, circa 528 BCE, at 35 years of age, Gautama Buddha taught his first sermon after attaining enlightenment at Bodh Gaya. It is also where the Buddhist sangha first came into existence as a result of the enlightenment of his first five disciples (Kaundinya, Assaji, Bhaddiya, Vappa and Mahanama). According to the Mahaparinibbana Sutta (Sutta 16 of the Digha Nikaya), the Buddha mentioned Sarnath as one of the four places of pilgrimage his devout followers should visit and look upon with feelings of reverence. The other three sites are Lumbini (the birthplace of the Buddha), Bodh Gaya (where the Buddha achieved enlightenment), and Kushinagar (where the Buddha attained parinirvana).

Etymology
The name Sarnath derives from the Sanskrit word  (or Sārangnāth in the Pali language), which translates to "Lord of the Deer" in the English language. The name refers to an ancient Buddhist legend, in which the Bodhisattva was a deer and offered his life to a king instead of the doe the king was planning to kill. The king was so moved that he created the park as a deer sanctuary.

Isipatana is another name used to refer to Sarnath in Pali, the language of the Pali Canon. This name corresponds to the name  in the Sanskrit language.
Isipatana and  therefore translate to "the place where holy men descended", or "the hill of the fallen sages".

History

5th century BCE - 6th century CE
Buddhism flourished in Sarnath during the second urbanisation (c. 600 – 200 BCE, from the time of the Mahajanapadas through the Nanda and Maurya periods), in part because of patronage from kings and wealthy merchants based in Varanasi. By the 3rd century CE, Sarnath had become an important centre for the Sammatiya school of Buddhism (one of the early Buddhist schools), as well as for art and architecture. However, the presence of images of Heruka and Tara indicate that Vajrayana Buddhism was (at a later time) also practised here. Also, images of Hindu gods as Shiva and Brahma were found at the site, and a Jain temple was located very close to the Dhamek Stupa.

Buddhism further expanded in India during the Gupta (4th to 6th centuries) period. Faxian was a Chinese Buddhist monk who traveled extensively throughout northern India from 400-411 CE. In his description of Sarnath, he mentioned seeing four large towers and two viharas with monks residing in them.

6th century - 8th century
The influence of Buddhism continued to grow during the Later Gupta (6th–8th centuries). Xuanzang also wrote that "There are about 1500 priests here, who study the Little Vehicle according to the Sammatiya school. In his writings, Xuanzang mentioned a pillar constructed by Ashoka near a stupa that marked the location where the Buddha set the wheel of the law in motion.

8th century - 12th century
During the Pala (8th–11th centuries) period, the rulers built new mahaviharas such as Odantapuri, Somapura, Jagaddala, and Vikramashila and patronised existing ones such as Nalanda and Sarnath. During this time, Buddhist pilgrims and monks from all over Asia traveled to Sarnath to meditate and study. The Palas were the last major Buddhist dynasty to rule in the Indian subcontinent. They were replaced by the Gahadavala dynasty, whose capital was located at Varanasi.

Although the Gahadavala kings were Hindu, they were tolerant of Buddhism. Inscriptions unearthed at Sarnath in the early 20th century indicate that some of the monasteries there enjoyed royal patronage from the Gahadavala rulers. For example, in a mid-12th-century inscription attributed to Queen Kumaradevi (consort of King Govindachandra), she takes credit for the construction or restoration of a living quarters for monks. It is widely asserted that the structure referred to in the Kumaradevi inscription is the Dharma Chakra Jina Vihar, but the evidence for this is inconclusive. Whatever the case, it is likely to be among the last structures to be built at Sarnath prior to its destruction in 1194. The inscription, excavated at Sarnath in March 1908, is currently maintained at the Sarnath Archeological Museum.

late 12th century: the destruction of Sarnath
Along with Sarnath (which is located in present-day Uttar Pradesh), the most important Buddhist mahaviharas in India were Vikramashila, Odantapuri, and Nalanda (all located in present-day Bihar). All four of these centres of learning continued to thrive throughout the 12th century, probably because of the protection, support and tolerance demonstrated by the Pala and Gahadavala rulers. For example, the Kumaradevi inscription mentions that King Govindachandra had protected Varanasi from invasions by the Ghaznavids (which the inscription refers to as Turushkas) in the early to mid-12th century. Apart from North India, Buddhism had been declining throughout the Indian subcontinent and had virtually disappeared by the 11th century.

Islamic invasions in the late 12th century brought massive plunder and destruction to northern India. Most notable among these were the military campaigns of Muhammad of Ghor, the Ghurid ruler from Ghazni (which is in present-day Afghanistan). Qutbuddin Aibek — the Turkic commander of Muhammad of Ghor's army — led an army from Ghazni to Varanasi and Sarnath in 1194 CE. Rai Jai Chand (c. 1170–1194 CE, the reigning Gahadavala dynasty king at that time) was killed during the Battle of Chandawar, and virtually everything of value in Varanasi and Sarnath was destroyed or plundered. Qutbuddin Aibek reportedly carted away some 1400 camel loads of treasure. According to the 13th-century Persian historian Hasan Nizami, "nearly 1000 temples were destroyed and mosques were raised on their foundations, the Rais and chiefs of Hind came forward to proffer their allegiance [to the Ghurids]".

While Qutbuddin Aibek destroyed Sarnath, it was the troops of Bakhtiyar Khalji—another of Muhammad of Ghor's slave generals—that finished the job. They destroyed Vikramashila in 1193, Odantapuri in 1197, and Nalanda in 1200. The Buddhists who survived this genocide in northern India fled to Nepal, Sikkim, Tibet, or South India. By the end of the 12th century, Buddhism had effectively disappeared from the Indian subcontinent, except for these areas.

18th century: rediscovery and looting
Very few Buddhists remained in India after their persecution and expulsion at the end of the 12th century by the Ghurids. Buddhists from Tibet, Burma, and Southeast Asia continued to make pilgrimages to South Asia from the 13th to the 17th centuries, but their most common destination was Bodh Gaya and not Sarnath. Sarnath continued to be a place of pilgrimage for Jains, however. A 17th-century Jain manuscript written in 1612 CE (the Tirthakalpa, by Jinaprabha Suri) describes a Jain temple in Varanasi as being located close to "a famous Bodisattva sanctuary" at a place called dharmeksā. This Sanskrit word translates to "pondering of the law", and clearly refers to the Dhamek Stupa.

India experienced an increase in visitation by European people in the late 18th century. In 1778, William Hodges became possibly the first British landscape painter to visit India. While there, he made careful observations of the art and architecture he encountered. He published an illustrated book about his travels in India in 1794. In his book, he described mosques and other Islamic architecture, Hindu temples, and Greek-inspired columns. Hodges also briefly described the Dhamek Stupa, although he mistook it to be a ruined Hindu temple.

In what is the first incontrovertible modern reference to the ruins at Sarnath, Jonathan Duncan (a charter member of the Asiatic Society and later Governor of Bombay) described the discovery of a green marble reliquary encased in a sandstone box in the relic chamber of a brick stupa at that location. The reliquary was discovered in January 1794, during the dismantling of a stupa (referred to by Alexander Cunningham as stupa "K" or the "Jagat Singh stupa", later identified as the Dharmarajika Stupa) by employees of Zamindar Jagat Singh (the dewan of Maharaja Chait Singh, the Raja of Benares). Duncan published his observations in 1799. The reliquary contained a few bones and some pearls, which were subsequently thrown into the Ganges river. The reliquary itself has also disappeared, although the outer sandstone box was replaced in the relic chamber, where it was rediscovered by Cunningham in 1835. The bricks of the stupa were hauled off and used for the construction of the market in Jagatganj, Varanasi. Jagat Singh and his crew also removed a large part of the facing of the Dhamek Stupa, and removed several Buddha statues which he retained at his house in Jagatganj.

19th century: more looting and early archeological excavations
The next modern description of Sarnath was by Francis Buchanan-Hamilton, who visited the site around 1813. He drew a crude map of the site—which he called Buddha Kashi—at that time. Colin Mackenzie was an officer in the British East India Company who later became the first Surveyor General of India. Visiting Sarnath in 1815, he was the first to describe a dedicated exploration of the ruins. Throughout the early 19th century, amateur archeologists explored and excavated at Sarnath, removing antiquities, and several artists drew sketches of the site (especially of the Dhamek Stupa).

In 1835-1836, a 21-year-old British Army engineer with the Bengal Engineer Group named Alexander Cunningham conducted the first systematic archaeological excavations at Sarnath. He had carefully studied the writings of Faxian and Xuanzang, two Chinese Buddhist monks who traveled extensively throughout northern India in the early 5th and early 7th centuries, respectively. Based on their writings and those of Duncan, he conducted some careful measurements and excavations at Sarnath in 1835-1836. During the course of these excavations, Cunningham discovered and removed many statues from monastery "L" and temple "M", as well as the sandstone box reported by Duncan from the Dharmarajika Stupa. He presented these items to the Asiatic Society of Bengal, and they are now located in the Indian Museum in Kolkata. By 1836, Cunningham had conclusively identified Sarnath as the location of the Buddha's first sermon. In 1861, Cunningham became the founder and first Director-General of the Archaeological Survey of India.

In 1851-1852, Markham Kittoe (1808–1853) conducted further excavations at Sarnath. Kittoe noted the presence of four stupas at Sarnath and excavated a structure he described as a hospital, which was located roughly midway between the Dhamek and Jagat Singh stupas. He also recovered a seated Buddha statue from Jagat Singh's house and transcribed its inscription. In his writings, Kittoe speculated that Sarnath was destroyed as a result of a great fire.

Sometime in the mid-19th century, Sarnath was subjected to further depredations, as 48 statues and a tremendous amount of bricks and stones were removed from the historic site to be used in the construction of two bridges over the Varuna River. A final instance of despoilation occurred around 1898, when many bricks and stones were removed from Sarnath and used as ballast for a narrow-gauge railway that was under construction at that time.

20th century: extensive excavations and restoration

Friedrich Oertel conducted extensive excavations in 1904-1905. His team focused on the area near stupa "J" (the Dhamek Stupa), stupa "K" ("Jagat Singh stupa", now known as the Dharmarajika Stupa), monastery "L", temple "M", hospital "N", monastery "O", and the Ashokan pillar. In March 1905, the team exhumed parts of the base and shaft of the pillar with its Schism Edict, lion capital, and remnants of the dharmachakra sculpture. Dating to c. 241-233 BCE, these are the oldest and most important relics discovered at Sarnath thus far. J. Ph. Vogel translated the inscription—which was written in the Brahmi of the Maurya period-and tentatively dated it to 249 BCE.

Present day: archaeological ruins

According to the Mahaparinibbana Sutta (Sutta 16 of the Digha Nikaya), the Buddha mentioned Sarnath as one of the four places of pilgrimage his devout followers should visit and look upon with feelings of reverence. Beginning in the late 18th century, ancient sites such as Sarnath have been subjected to extensive archaeological study and restoration. Consequently, Sarnath has regained its former status as a place of pilgrimage, both for Buddhists and Jains. In 1998, Sarnath was nominated for inclusion on the United Nations Educational, Scientific and Cultural Organization (UNESCO) list of World Heritage Sites of outstanding universal value to cultural heritage. The nomination comprises two groups of monuments: group "A" is represented by the Chaukhandi Stupa, while all other monuments (e.g., temples, stupas, monasteries, and the pillar of Ashoka) are included as part of group "B". Sites of greatest importance to Buddhist pilgrims include:
 The Dharmarajika Stupa is one of the few pre-Ashokan stupas remaining at Sarnath, although only the foundations remain. It has been the subject of extensive depredations and archaeological excavations, from the late 18th through the early 20th century.
 The Ashokan pillar erected here was broken during the invasions of the 12th century but many of the pieces remain at the original location. The pillar was originally surmounted by the Lion Capital of Ashoka, which in turn served as the base of a large 32-spoke sandstone wheel of dharma. The lion capital and the wheel of dharma, presently on display at the Sarnath Archeological Museum, now symbolize the modern state of India. Both of these appear on the emblem of the Supreme Court of India, and the wheel of dharma is incorporated in the flag of India.
 The ruins of the ancient Mulagandha Kuty Vihara mark the place where the Buddha spent his first rainy season. This was the main temple marked by the presence of the Ashokan pillar at the front. The 5th-century CE sandstone sculpture of Buddha Preaching his First Sermon was found in the vicinity.
 The Dharma Chakra Jina Vihar, a massive monastery and living quarters for monks believed to have been constructed or restored in the mid-12th century at the behest of Kumaradevi, a wife of Govindachandra (c. 1114–1155 CE).
 The Chaukhandi Stupa commemorates the spot where the Buddha met up with his first five disciples (Kaundinya, Assaji, Bhaddiya, Vappa and Mahanama). The tower was erected as a memorial to Emperor Humayun by his son Akbar in 1588 CE.
 The Sarnath Archeological Museum houses the famous Lion Capital of Ashoka, which miraculously survived its 45-foot drop to the ground (from the top of the Ashokan pillar), and became the State Emblem of India and national symbol on the flag of India. The museum also houses the original 5th-century CE sandstone sculpture of Buddha Preaching his First Sermon, as well as the Kumaradevi inscription.

Modern places of worship
In addition to the archaeological ruins, there are a number of other pilgrimage sites and places of worship in Sarnath. Among these are included:
 The modern Mulagandha Kuty Vihara is a temple constructed by the Maha Bodhi Society; it was opened to the public in 1931. Wealthy Hawaiian philanthropist and benefactor Mary Robinson Foster provided much of the financial support for this project, while Anagarika Dharmapala supervised its construction. Dharmapala was a Sri Lankan Buddhist monk who was instrumental in the revival of Buddhism in India after it had been virtually extinct in that country for seven centuries. The temple contains a gilded replica of a 5th-century CE sculpture of Buddha Preaching his First Sermon. Its interior walls are extensively decorated with frescoes by Japanese artist Kosetsu Nosu (1885-1973), depicting important events in the life of the Buddha.
 Anagarika Dharmapala Museum & offices of the Maha Bodhi Society, located on Dharmapala Road, just south of the modern Mulagandha Kuty Vihara
 A standing Buddha statue,  in height, inspired by the Buddhas of Bamiyan, is located on the grounds of the Thai temple and monastery at Sarnath. Construction began in 1997, and the statue was finally unveiled in 2011.
 A number of countries and regions in which Buddhism is a major religion (such as Cambodia, China, Japan, Korea, Myanmar, Sri Lanka, Thailand, Tibet, and Vietnam) have established temples and monasteries in Sarnath in the style that is typical for their respective cultures, so visitors can gain insight into Buddhism from the perspectives of many different cultures.
 A bodhi tree planted by Anagarika Dharmapala which has grown from a cutting of the one at Bodh Gaya
 Padmasambhava Buddhist Center: Padma Samye Chokhor Ling Monastery, Orgyen Samye Chokhor Ling Nunnery, Khenchen Palden Sherab Rinpoche Stupa
 Vajra Vidya Institute for Higher Buddhist Studies
 Garden of Spiritual Wisdom, located on the grounds of the Chaukhandi Stupa

As a Jain pilgrimage site

It is also the place where four of the five auspicious life events of Shreyansanatha took place. According to Jain cosmology, the fifth auspicious life event is the attainment of moksha. Shreyansanatha was among the twenty Jain tirthankaras who attained moksha in Sametshikhar.

Sarnath has been an important pilgrimage site for Jains for centuries. A 17th-century Jain manuscript describes a Jain temple in Varanasi as being located close to "a famous Bodisattva sanctuary" at a place called dharmeksā. This Sanskrit word translates to "pondering of the law", and clearly refers to the Dhamek Stupa. The current edifice—Sarnath Jain Tirth (also known as the Shri Digamber Jain Temple or Shreyanshnath Jain Temple)—was constructed in 1824. The main deity of this temple is a blue-coloured statue of Shreyansanatha,  in height, in the lotus position.

Other tourist attractions
Tourist attractions unrelated to Buddhism and spirituality in Sarnath include the Sarnath Deer Park and Fish Canal, and the Sarnath Turtle Breeding and Rehabilitation Centre.

In English literature
In her 1832 poetical illustration , to a picture by Samuel Prout, Letitia Elizabeth Landon compared the four major religions of the world and mentioned the persecution and subsequent expulsion of the Buddhists from India.

Sarnath is one of the locations of Rudyard Kipling's 1901 novel Kim. Teshoo Lama stays at the "Temple of the Tirthankhers" in Sarnath when not on his pilgrimages.

The Nameless City is a fictional short story published in 1921 by H. P. Lovecraft. When the narrator of this story sees the ruins of the Nameless City, he "thought of Sarnath the Doomed, that stood in the land of Mnar when mankind was young, and of Ib, that was carven of grey stone before mankind existed." Lovecraft had previously described the fictional city of Sarnath in his 1920 story The Doom That Came to Sarnath.

Gallery

References

Cited works

External links

Sarnath India Art Architecture Archcelogy History Culture Study Project
Sarnath Temple

Buddhist pilgrimage sites in India
Buddhist sites in Uttar Pradesh
Census towns in Varanasi district
Early Buddhism
Former populated places in India
Gautama Buddha
Jain temples in Uttar Pradesh
Sarnath
Varanasi district